Figueiró dos Vinhos is a city in Leiria District - Portugal. The population in 2021 was 5,281 , in an area of 173.44 km².

Demographics

Parishes
Administratively, the municipality is divided into 4 civil parishes (freguesias):
 Aguda
 Arega
 Campelo
 Figueiró dos Vinhos e Bairradas

Notable people 
 Maria Benedita Mouzinho de Albuquerque de Faria Pinho (1865-1939) a Portuguese writer, translator, teacher, propagandist, republican activist and feminist activist.
 José Simões de Almeida (1880–1950) a Portuguese naturalist sculptor.

References

External links
 Municipality official website
 Website Casal de São Simão

Towns in Portugal
Populated places in Leiria District
Municipalities of Leiria District